The 1999 West Somerset District Council election took place on 6 May 1999 to elect members of West Somerset District Council in Somerset, England. The whole council was up for election with boundary changes since the last election in 1995. The council stayed under no overall control.

Election result

3 independent, 2 Conservative and 1 Labour candidates were unopposed at the election. A further 2 seats had no candidates standing for them.

Ward results

By-elections between 1999 and 2003

Williton

Aville Vale

References

1999 English local elections
1999
1990s in Somerset